The Cinema Express Best Actor Award is given as a part of its annual Cinema Express Awards for Tamil (Kollywood) films.

Winners

References 

Cinema Express Awards
Film awards for lead actor